The 2012 Quicken Loans 400 was the 15th stock car race of the 2012 NASCAR Sprint Cup Series. It was held on June 17, 2012, in Brooklyn, Michigan, at Michigan International Speedway, before a crowd of 82,000 people. The track is a superspeedway that holds NASCAR races. Hendrick Motorsports driver Dale Earnhardt Jr. won the 200-lap race starting from 17th place. Tony Stewart of the Stewart-Haas Racing team finished in second, and Roush Fenway Racing's Matt Kenseth was third.

Marcos Ambrose won his first career pole position by posting a new track record speed in qualifying. He led the first five laps until Greg Biffle passed him on the sixth lap. He led the next twenty laps before Ambrose retook it for another five laps afterward. Biffle retook the lead on lap 54, holding it until Ambrose re-passed him to return to the front of the field fifteen laps later. Earnhardt took the lead for the first time on the 70th lap, and he kept the position for a total of 95 laps, more than any other driver. At the race's final restart on 141, Earnhardt led through the final round of green flag pit stops to win the race. There were a total of eight cautions and 23 lead changes among 14 drivers during the event.

The victory was Earnhardt's first in 143 races, his second at Michigan International Speedway, and the 19th of his career. The result moved him to within four points of Drivers' Championship leader Kenseth. Biffle maintained third place, and Jimmie Johnson moved past Denny Hamlin in fourth place. Chevrolet maintained its lead in the Manufacturers' Championship with 105 points, 18 points ahead of Toyota, 28 points in front of Ford, and 44 points ahead of Dodge with 21 races left in the season. The race attracted 5,284,000 television viewers.

Background

The 2012 Quicken Loans 400 was the 15th of 36 scheduled stock car races of the 2012 NASCAR Sprint Cup Series. The standard track at Michigan International Speedway is a four-turn  superspeedway. The track's turns are banked at eighteen degrees, while the front stretch (the location of the finish line) is banked at twelve degrees. The back stretch, has a five degree banking.

In preparation for the race, NASCAR held two test sessions on June 12, 2012 for teams to test the newer pavement at Michigan, the first since 1995. Top speeds approached  during the day; NASCAR determined that the installation of restrictor plates would not be required, and NASCAR vice-president of competition Robin Pemberton spoke of his expectation that speeds would reduce as the surface rubbered in and track temperatures increased.

Before the race, Matt Kenseth led the Drivers' Championship with 523 points, and Dale Earnhardt Jr. stood in second with 513 points. Greg Biffle was in third place on 507 points, three points ahead of Denny Hamlin in fourth and fourteen points in front of Jimmie Johnson in fifth. Harvick, with 470 points, was five points in front of Martin Truex Jr., as Stewart with 448 points, was five points in front of Clint Bowyer in ninth and eight points in front of the tenth-placed Brad Keselowski. Carl Edwards and Kyle Busch rounded out the top twelve drivers. In the Manufacturers' Championship, Chevrolet was leading with 96 points, thirteen points ahead of Toyota in the second position. Ford, with 71 points, was also thirteen points ahead of Dodge in the battle for third place. Hamlin was the race's defending champion.

There were two driver changes heading into the race. After he was suspended from the preceding Pocono 400 for verbally abusing Sporting News reporter Bob Pockrass at the Nationwide Series round at Dover International Speedway, Kurt Busch was reinstated to the  51 Phoenix Racing car after David Reutimann drove in his place. Team owner James Finch spoke to Busch during the week, and confirmed that the driver would remain with the team until the end of the year. Tommy Baldwin Racing announced that driver Tony Raines would compete in its No. 10 car in place of Reutimann as part of the team's plan for the upcoming races.

Practice and qualifying
Three practice sessions were held before the Sunday race. The first and second sessions that took place on Friday ran for 80 minutes, and the third additional practice session held on Saturday lasted 75 minutes. In the first practice session, Martin was fastest with a lap of 35.754 seconds, almost six hundredths of a second faster than Earnhardt in second. Trevor Bayne, Stewart, Kenseth, Juan Pablo Montoya, Jeff Gordon, Kasey Kahne, Paul Menard, and Truex followed in positions three to ten. Biffle paced the second practice session with a 35.172 seconds lap. He was six hundredths of a second faster than Marcos Ambrose in the second position. Harvick, Edwards, Menard, Bayne, Johnson, Joey Logano, Kurt Busch, and Kenseth completed the top ten ahead of the qualifying session. The only incident in the Friday practice sessions was Jamie McMurray scraping the right-hand quarter of his vehicle when he made contact with the outside barrier.

Blisters appeared on several front-side tires used by an estimated one-quarter of teams during the session, and that caused drivers to raise concerns about the speed they were driving at on the warm track surface and the hot weather temperatures that were experienced in the opening two practice sessions. Harvick suggested that all the drivers slow to manage the wear of their tires when the track surface rubbered in, while Edwards and Hamlin reported no issues with their tires; the former said he would discuss the situation with his crew chief Bob Osborne. NASCAR's control tire supplier Goodyear advised all teams to scuff their tires, and run them through a heat cycle. The tires run in practice were later utilized in the Saturday morning qualifying session.

Forty-five drivers were entered in the qualifier on Saturday afternoon, according to NASCAR's qualifying procedure, 43 were allowed to race. Each driver was limited to two timed laps, with the starting order determined by the competitor's fastest times. Recording a track speed record of  that broke's Ryan Newman's achievement in June 2005, Ambrose clinched the first pole position of his career with a time of 35.426 seconds. He was joined on the grid's front row by Harvick who was 0.211 seconds slower, and held the pole until Ambrose's lap. Biffle qualified third, Kahne took fourth, and Newman started fifth. Kenseth, Bayne, Stewart, Logano, and Johnson rounded out the top ten qualifiers. Edwards' engine developed a possible fuel related issue on his warm-up lap, and he did not set a timed effort. The two drivers who failed to qualify were David Stremme and Stacy Compton. After qualifying, Ambrose said, "It is a good bragging right, I’ll give it that, I'm just really excited to get the speed, and to claim to be the fastest guy out there is just awesome. We’ve missed some poles — this is my first pole in Sprint Cup. We’ve missed some by thousandths of a second and conditions changing, so it's good that we actually got one to stick, and one that's got so many records attached to it."

After qualifying, Goodyear changed the left-hand side tire combination to a more durable and harder compound after consulting teams and analysing data, but retained the original right-hand side compound. They transported 1,200 tires from a warehouse in North Carolina to ensure each team met NASCAR's requirement of using 10 sets of tires for the event, and they arrived in Michigan on Saturday afternoon. An extra 75 minute practice session was scheduled following the track's Nationwide Series race. Biffle was quickest with a lap of 36.801 seconds, followed by Johnson, Edwards, Kahne, McMurray, Kurt Busch, A. J. Allmendinger, Truex, Martin, and Harvick. Newman felt that NASCAR made the correct decision, and Edwards predicted that the while the cars were looser, it would improve the quality of racing. Earnhardt, however, commented that he could not complete extra laps due to a handling difficulty, and Ambrose noted a lower amount of grip and increased vehicular imbalance provided by the tires.

Qualifying results

Race
Live television coverage of the race began at 12:01 p.m. Eastern Daylight Time (UTC−05:00) in the United States on TNT. Commentary was provided by Adam Alexander, Wally Dallenbach Jr. and Kyle Petty. The start was delayed at 1:18 local time because jet driers were instructed to remove standing water. It began to drizzle 73 minutes later, and jet driers again circulated the track. Doug Bradshaw, pastor of Williamston Free Methodist Church, began pre-race ceremonies with an invocation. Members of the United States Army Band performed the national anthem, and Detroit Red Wings ice hockey starting goaltender Jimmy Howard and his son James commanded the drivers to start their engines. During the pace laps, Johnson and Newman moved to the rear of the field because they had changed their engines.

The race commenced at 3:05 p.m. local time. Ambrose broke free from the pack to lead on the approach to the first turn. The first caution came on the following lap when Kurt Busch spun on the backstretch. Ambrose maintained the lead at the lap five restart and held off a challenge from Biffle. On lap six, Biffle tried again, and was successful next time round, getting ahead of Ambrose to take over the lead. Josh Wise's engine failed on lap ten, necessitating the second caution as oil was laid on the track. During the caution, Earnhardt and Biffle made pit stops. The race restarted six laps later, with Biffle keeping his lead over Ambrose. After starting ninth, Logano had moved into the third position by the 21st lap. On the next lap, Kenseth passed Logano to move into third place. A competition caution was waved on lap 26 to mandate that teams made pit stops because of the new left-hand side tires, and the track's newer pavement. Ambrose led the field at the restart on the 31st lap. Kenseth overtook Ambrose to claim the lead on the next lap.

After starting 34th, Kyle Busch was running in seventh by lap 34. As Kenseth increased his lead over Ambrose, Martin overtook Logano for third place on the 39th lap. Four laps later, Logano lost the fourth position to Biffle. That same lap, Keselowski got ahead of Almirola for tenth. Upfront, Ambrose closed the gap to Kenseth, and he overtook him for the lead on lap 49 despite the presence of Ken Schrader's slower car. A second competition caution for drivers to make mandatory pit stops came out on lap 51. The caution was withdrawn five laps later, and Biffle led the field at the restart, followed by Ambrose and Martin. On lap 60, Ambrose attempted to challenge Biffle for the first position but he could not pass him. Keselowski moved into fifth four laps later. On the 69th lap, Ambrose passed Biffle for the lead, and Earnhardt got ahead of Biffle soon after. On the next lap, Earnhardt overtook Ambrose to become the new leader. While Earnhardt increased his advantage at the front of the pack, Martin got by Biffle to advance into third by the 79th lap.

In the meantime, drivers elected to make green flag pit stops between the 78th to 81st laps. On lap 82, the fifth caution was prompted when foam from a SAFER barrier beside the circuit had to be cleared by series officials. Drivers continued to make pit stops under caution conditions. At the lap 87 restart, Earnhardt was passed by Stewart on the entry to the first turn for the first position. Newman and Logano got ahead of Ambrose to move into sixth and seventh places on lap 90. Ambrose lost a further four positions to Martin, Keselowski, Menard, and Montoya during lap 91. By the following lap, Gordon was in fourth place. Later, Stewart increased his lead over Earnhardt to seven-tenths of a second by lap 97. However, eight laps later, Earnhardt closed the gap to Stewart and passed him to get back the lead. Green flag pit stops were made from laps 115 and 120, before a sixth caution came out for Kurt Busch who spun for a second time in the second turn on the 121st lap. Gordon led at the lap 126 restart, but his teammate Earnhardt passed him around the outside in turn two soon after.

On the lap, a seventh caution was prompted for a three-car accident, that began when Logano attempted to avoid hitting Gilliland (who made contact with the barrier), and lost control of his car. Logano turned back into the wall, collecting Gilliland and Kahne. Logano was transported out of the track via an ambulance as a precaution. The race restarted on the 133rd lap, with Earnhardt holding the lead over Gordon and Montoya through the first and second turns. Soon after, the eighth caution was waved; Hamlin and Newman made contact, sending Hamlin spinning on the exit to turn four, and into the grass. As Hamlin went down pit road with oil trailing from his car, its right-hand side caught fire, and he stopped in his pit box. Hamlin received assistance to exit his car by Newman's and Kyle Busch's pit crews, as safety officials extinguished the fire. Hamlin was unhurt. Earnhardt continued to maintain the lead through turn one at the lap 141 restart. Behind Earnhardt, Stewart kept second place from Gordon. Five laps later, Biffle passed Bowyer for fourth, and Ambrose was overtaken by Martin for tenth.

Johnson got past Montoya on the 147th lap. Twelve laps later, Bowyer was passed by Kenseth. Biffle overtook Gordon to move into third on lap 160. The final round of green flag pit stops began on lap 163, as Earnhardt made his stop. Biffle, Bowyer, McMurray, and Keselowski each led the pack over the next seven laps, until Earnhardt regained the lead after all pit stops had been completed. On lap 186, Biffle lost third place to Johnson. Six laps later, Johnson lost third to Kenseth, and fell to fifth as Biffle got ahead of him. In the meantime, Earnhardt opened his lead at the front of the field to more than five seconds, and he held it for the remainder of the race to win. It was his first victory in 143 races, his second at Michigan International Speedway, and the 19th of his career. Stewart finished second, Kenseth was third, Biffle took fourth, and Johnson fifth. Gordon, Bowyer, Montoya, Ambrose, and Harvick rounded out the top ten finishers. There were 23 lead changes among 14 different drivers during the race. Earnhardt's 95 laps led was the most of any competitor.

Post-race

Earnhardt appeared in Victory Lane to celebrate his first win since the 2008 LifeLock 400 in front of the crowd of 82,000 people; the win earned him $168,775. He dedicated the victory to his fanbase and thanked his team and pit crew for supporting him, "I was so nervous in the last few laps of that race four years ago. Today, this is the worst feeling, riding around there with 15 laps to go wondering what's going to happen or how you were going to lose. I was just thinking, man, those laps could not go by fast enough. It feels good to win, But in a day or two, I'll be thirsty for the next one." Stewart conceded that Earnhardt had a faster car than his but insisted that the latter's victory was not designated as "a national holiday" due to its popularity, "This morning they were celebrating his fourth anniversary of his last win, so I guess we're all in a state of mourning now, because he's broke that string now, so I don't know what we're all supposed to think." Third-placed Kenseth said of his race, "It was kind of a long day. We were pretty good in the beginning of the race and got shuffled back and it was tough to work traffic today. They got the setup good on the last two runs and had good pit stops and we were able to stand on the gas and work our way up there to third."

Earnhardt received congratulations via text messages from various people and celebrities through Twitter, including former driver Mario Andretti, multi-instrumentalist Charlie Daniels and country music singer Brad Paisley. He also received a phone call from South Carolina Gamecocks football coach Steve Spurrier. Steve Letarte, Earnhardt's crew chief, commented his belief that the driver and team's focus helped him to win, "I can't say enough about the group of guys we have here. They are a tremendous group. They deserve a tremendous amount of the credit. Dale deserves a tremendous amount of credit as well. He's not only a great driver, but he's a leader in the team. He does it in his own style and we love the style he brings. It was a fun day to finally get him to Victory Lane." Tori Petry of sports radio station WGGG opined the victory helped NASCAR receive better exposure, and Los Angeles Times writer Jim Peltz wrote he believed it would provide the series with an attendance and television ratings increase. Jeff Hammond of Speed said the victory was the result of Earnhardt's team having improved momentum and better focus. He wrote of his expectation for Earnhardt to perform well for the remainder of the season.

Hamlin's car bay fire on lap 133 was the first of his career. He said it was an experience that he hoped to avoid in the future but praised the modern safety standards of racing vehicles, "Thankfully, we've got everything that we have safety-wise. One good thing at least is that Ryan's guys came and got me out – and a couple of the 18 (Busch's) guys. NASCAR is a family, and any time anyone is in trouble, everyone is going to try to help. It's good that those guys were around and willing to take a chance." Logano commented that he believed he could have corrected his car in his three-car crash with Gilliland and Kahne, "It's a little frustrating, but we had a top-10 car today, I think we had a top 10 coming to us here – maybe a top five." Ambrose, who led early in the event and then lost positions, said he would accept a top ten finish and was proud of his team, "We led some laps and looked good up there. It was a strong day for us. Not quite what we wanted, but we will take it and move along to Sonoma."

The result kept Kenseth in the lead of the Drivers' Championship with 523 points, ahead of Earnhardt who lowered his advantage from ten to four points. Biffle maintained third place with 548 points. With 532 points, Johnson moved ahead of Hamlin (514 points) to assume the fourth position. Harvick, Truex, Stewart, Bowyer, Keselowski, Edwards and Kyle Busch rounded out the top twelve. In the Manufacturers' Championship, Chevrolet maintained the lead with 105 points. Toyota remained in second place with 87 points, ten points ahead of Ford, who in turn, were sixteen points in front of Dodge in fourth. The race had a television audience of 5,284,000 million viewers and a 3.2 US rating, a 10 percent ratings increase and 8 percent more viewership than the 2011 race; it took two hours, 52 minutes, and 29 seconds to complete, and the margin of victory was 5.393 seconds.

Race results

Standings after the race

Drivers' Championship standings

Manufacturers' Championship standings

Note: Only the top twelve positions are included for the driver standings.

Notes and references

Notes

References

NASCAR races at Michigan International Speedway
Quicken Loans 400
Quicken Loans 400
Quicken Loans 400